KQVE-LD is a low-powered television station (LPTV) owned by the Daystar television network. It broadcasts on virtual channel 46 and licensed to San Antonio, Texas by Word Of God Fellowship. It is not yet available on Time Warner Cable.

References

External links 

Television stations in Texas
Daystar (TV network) affiliates
Television channels and stations established in 1993